The Ketzin Cable Ferry is a vehicular cable ferry that crosses the River Havel between Ketzin and Schmergow, both located in Brandenburg, Germany.

References 

Ferry transport in Brandenburg
Cable ferries in Germany